Sinkweon Jang is a South Korean long-distance runner. At the 2012 Summer Olympics, he competed in the Men's marathon, finishing in 73rd place.

References

South Korean male long-distance runners
South Korean male marathon runners
Living people
Olympic athletes of South Korea
Athletes (track and field) at the 2012 Summer Olympics
1983 births
Sportspeople from Gyeonggi Province
21st-century South Korean people